Opechee Bay is a  lake located in Belknap County in the Lakes Region of central New Hampshire, United States, in the city of Laconia. It is located directly downstream from Paugus Bay and Lake Winnipesaukee, and it connects by a one-mile segment of the Winnipesaukee River through the center of Laconia to Lake Winnisquam.

The lake is classified as a cold- and warmwater fishery, with observed species including brook trout, rainbow trout, land-locked salmon, lake trout, lake whitefish, smallmouth and largemouth bass, chain pickerel, horned pout, white perch, black crappie, and bluegill.

See also

List of lakes in New Hampshire

References

Lakes of Belknap County, New Hampshire